The Raven 1600 SV is an American aircraft engine, designed and produced by Raven Redrives of El Prado, New Mexico for use in ultralight and homebuilt aircraft.

The company seems to have gone out of business in 2017 and production ended.

Design and development
The engine is a four-cylinder four-stroke, in-line,  displacement, liquid-cooled, automotive conversion, gasoline engine design, with a poly V belt reduction drive with a reduction ratio of 2.36:1. It employs electronic ignition and produces  at 5500 rpm.

Specifications (1600 SV)

See also

References

External links
Official website archives on Archive.org

Raven aircraft engines
Liquid-cooled aircraft piston engines
2010s aircraft piston engines